Epicoma is a genus of prominent moths in the family Notodontidae. There are more than 20 described species in Epicoma, found mainly in Australia.

Species
These 25 species belong to the genus Epicoma:

 Epicoma anisozyga Turner
 Epicoma argentata Walker, 1865
 Epicoma argentosa T.P.Lucas, 1890
 Epicoma asbolina Turner, 1902
 Epicoma barnardi
 Epicoma barytima Turner, 1917
 Epicoma chrysosema Turner
 Epicoma contristis
 Epicoma derbyana Strand, 1929
 Epicoma dispar Turner
 Epicoma isabella White, 1841
 Epicoma melanospila Walker
 Epicoma melanosticta Don.
 Epicoma nigrolineata Joicey & Talbot
 Epicoma ochrogutta Herrich-Schäffer
 Epicoma phoenura Turner
 Epicoma pontifascialis Rosenstock, 1885
 Epicoma pontificalis
 Epicoma protrahens T.P.Lucas, 1890
 Epicoma rubricorpus Swinhoe
 Epicoma signata Walker
 Epicoma subargentea
 Epicoma tristis Lewin
 Epicoma walkeri Strand, 1929
 Epicoma zelotes Turner

References

Further reading

 
 
 

Thaumetopoeinae